Craig Womack is an author and professor of Native American literature.  Identifying as Creek-Cherokee by ancestry, Womack wrote the book Red on Red: Native American Literary Separatism, a book of literary criticism which argues that the dominant approach to academic study of Native American literature is incorrect.  Instead of using poststructural and postcolonial approaches that do not have their basis in Native culture or experience, Womack claims the work of the Native critic should be to develop tribal models of criticism.  In 2002, Craig won Wordcraft Circle Writer of the Year Winner. Along with Robert Allen Warrior, Jace Weaver and Greg Sarris, Womack asserted themselves as a nationalist (American Indian literary nationalism), which is part of an activist movement. The movement significantly altered the critical methodologies used to approach Native American literature.

Womack has also produced a novel, Drowning in Fire, about the lives of young gay Native Americans.

Currently, Womack is employed as a professor at Emory University, specializing in Native American literature.

Bibliography

Books 

Drowning in Fire, 200/1 
Red on Red: Native American literary separatism, 1999.  
 Teuton Reasoning Together: The Native Critics Collective  University of Oklahoma Press, 2008. 
 Art as performance, story as criticism: reflections on native literary aesthetics University of Oklahoma Press, 2009.

Presentations 

 "Baptists and Witches: Multiple Jurisdictions in a Muskogee Creek Story" Southern Spaces. July 17, 2007. 
 "Cosmopolitanism and Nationalism in Native American Literature: A Panel Discussion." Southern Spaces, 21 June 2011.

See also
Native American studies

References

External links
Womack's University of Oklahoma listing
Canonizing Craig Womack, article in the American Indian Quarterly.
2005 Interview with blogccritics magazine 

American literary theorists
American people of Cherokee descent
American people of Muscogee descent
American people who self-identify as being of Native American descent
Emory University faculty
Living people
Year of birth missing (living people)